The year 1997 is the 9th year in the history of Shooto, a mixed martial arts promotion based in the Japan. In 1997 Shooto held 5 events beginning with, Shooto: Reconquista 1.

Title fights

Events list

Shooto: Reconquista 1

Shooto: Reconquista 1 was an event held on January 18, 1997, at Korakuen Hall in Tokyo, Japan.

Results

Shooto: Reconquista 2

Shooto: Reconquista 2 was an event held on April 6, 1997, at Korakuen Hall in Tokyo, Japan.

Results

Shooto: Gig

Shooto: Gig was an event held on June 25, 1997, at Kitazawa Town Hall in Tokyo, Japan.

Results

Shooto: Reconquista 3

Shooto: Reconquista 3 was an event held on August 27, 1997, at Korakuen Hall in Tokyo, Japan.

Results

Shooto: Reconquista 4

Shooto: Reconquista 4 was an event held on October 12, 1997, at Korakuen Hall in Tokyo, Japan.

Results

See also 
 Shooto
 List of Shooto champions
 List of Shooto Events

References

Shooto events
1997 in mixed martial arts